August, Duke of Schleswig-Holstein-Sonderburg-Beck (13 February 1652 – 26 September 1689) was a Danish nobleman. From 1675 until his death, he was the ruling Duke of Schleswig-Holstein-Sonderburg-Beck.  He was the second duke of this appanage.

Life 
August was the eldest son of Duke August Philip (1612-1675) and his wife, Countess Marie Sibylle of Nassau-Saarbrücken (1628-1699).  Four of his younger brothers and four sisters survived into adulthood.  His father was the fifth son of Duke Alexander and a grandson of John II, the founder of the Schleswig-Holstein-Sonderburg line.

The Schleswig-Holstein-Sonderburg-Beck was named after Beck House, a manor in Ulenburg, which is today the smallest borough of Löhne, a town in north-eastern North Rhine-Westphalia.  At the time, Ulenburg was situated in the Bishopric of Minden. In 1648, the Margraviate of Brandenburg acquired the area.  Brandenburg was expanding its army and needed soldiers and officers.  The prime requirement for becoming an officer was noble birth.  Consequently, it was only natural for August to pursue a military career.  His became a Major general in the Brandenburg army.

August died of dysentery on 26 September 1689 in Bonn.  He was succeeded by his son Frederick William I.

Marriage and issue 
In 1676, August married Hedwig Louise of Lippe-Alverdissen (1650-1731), a daughter of Count Philip I, the founder of Schaumburg-Lippe line of the House of Lippe.  Together, they had two children:
 Dorothea Henriette (1678 – after 1755)
 Frederick William I (1682-1719), married Marie Antoinette of Sanfré

Ancestors

References 
 Carsten Porskrog Rasmussen et al. (eds.): Die Fürsten des Landes. Herzöge und Grafen von Schleswig, Holstein und Lauenburg, commissioned by the Gesellschaft für Schleswig-Holsteinische Geschichte, Wachholtz, Neumünster, 2008,

Footnotes 

1652 births
1689 deaths
17th-century German people
Military personnel of Prussia
Dukes of Schleswig-Holstein-Sonderburg-Beck
Deaths from dysentery